

Events 
 By place 

 Byzantine Empire 
 June 22 – Battle of Versinikia: The Bulgars, led by Krum, ruler (khan) of the Bulgarian Empire, defeat Emperor Michael I near Edirne (modern Turkey). The Byzantine army (26,000 men) is destroyed by a counter-attack of Bulgarian heavy cavalry, while trapped in the valley. Krum captures the Byzantine camp and a rich prize, including gold and weaponry.
 July 11 – Michael I, under threat by conspiracies, abdicates in favor of his general Leo the Armenian, and becomes a monk (under the name Athanasius). His sons are castrated to prevent them succeeding the Byzantine throne, and relegated into monasteries. One of them, Niketas (renamed Ignatius), eventually becomes a patriarch of Constantinople.
 July 17 – Krum reaches Constantinople, and sets his camp outside the walls. He is given an invitation, and a promise of safe conduct, to meet Leo V. Krum sets out unarmed for the capital with only a small escort, but is ambushed and manages to escape. After this unsuccessful Byzantine murder attempt, the Bulgars ravage much of Eastern Thrace.
 Autumn – Siege of Adrianople: Krum captures Adrianople—one of the most important Byzantine fortresses in Thrace—after being attacked with siege engines. The garrison is forced to surrender, due to starvation. On the orders of Krum, the population of the surrounding area (numbering about 10,000) is transferred to Bulgarian territory, north of the Danube. 
 Ashot I ("the Great") becomes the first Georgian Bagratid prince of Iberia, under Byzantine protection.

 Europe 
 September 11 — Louis the Pious, king of Aquitaine (and only surviving legitimate son), is crowned co-emperor of the Franks, with his father Charlemagne.
 Danish Viking raiders, led by King Horik I, attack Vestfold (modern Norway), due to its insubordination (approximate date).

 Abbasid Caliphate 
 Autumn – Siege of Baghdad: Caliph al-Amin surrenders Baghdad, after al-Ma'mun's General Tahir accepts his peace terms, but he is captured and executed. His brother al-Ma'mun becomes undisputed ruler of the Abbasid Caliphate.

 The Baghdad School of Astronomy is opened by al-Ma'mun.
 Caliph al Ma’mun founds a school in Baghdad called the House of Wisdom. In this school scholars translated Greek philosophy classics into Arabic.

 By topic 

 Religion 
 Third Council of Tours: Priests are ordered to preach in the vernacular (either Vulgar Latin or German).

Births 
 Fujiwara no Yoshimi, Japanese nobleman (d. 867)
 Fujiwara no Yoshisuke, Japanese statesman (d. 867)
 Li Rong, prince of the Tang Dynasty (or 812)
 Li Shangyin, Chinese official and poet (d. 858)
 Moses Bar-Kepha, Syriac bishop (approximate date)
 Muhammad at-Taqi, Muslim ninth Ismā'īlī imam (or 814)
 Theophilus, emperor of the Byzantine Empire (d. 842)
 Wandelbert, Benedictine monk (approximate date)

Deaths 
 ’Abd Allah ibn Wahb, Muslim jurist (b. 743)
 Eanberht, bishop of Hexham (approximate date)
 Muhammad ibn Harun al-Amin, Muslim caliph (b. 787)

References